Anil Arora is a Canadian civil servant who has been the chief statistician of Canada since September 19, 2016.

Career 
Arora began his career with Statistics Canada, reaching the post of Assistant Chief Statistician before moving to management positions in Natural Resources Canada and then Health Canada. He replaced Wayne Smith, who resigned to protest changes in Statistics Canada's informatics infrastructure stemming from the Shared Services Canada initiative.

References

Canadian statisticians
Living people
Year of birth missing (living people)
University of Alberta alumni